Karataunia is an extinct genus of butterfly from the Upper Jurassic of Karatau, Kazakhstan. It contains only one species, Karataunia lapidaria. Its family and superfamily placement is uncertain.

See also
Prehistoric Lepidoptera

References

Fossil Lepidoptera
†
Late Jurassic insects
Jurassic insects of Asia
Fossil taxa described in 1989